Nikolai Nikolayevich Radchenko (born 15 November 1995) is a Russian football player.

Club career
He made his professional debut in the Russian Football National League for FC SKA-Energiya Khabarovsk on 10 August 2014 in a game against FC Tosno.

Personal
He is the younger brother of Aleksandr Radchenko.

References

1995 births
Sportspeople from Khabarovsk
Living people
Russian footballers
Association football defenders
FC SKA-Khabarovsk players
FC Tyumen players
FC Tekstilshchik Ivanovo players
FC Nosta Novotroitsk players